Bautzen/Budyšin is a railway station in the town of Bautzen, Saxony, Germany. The station lies on the Görlitz–Dresden railway line and the Bautzen–Bad Schandau railway line, the latter now not running to Bautzen. The station is also on the former Bautzen–Hoyerswerda railway.

History 

The former engine shed or Bahnbetriebswerk of Bautzen ("Bw Bautzen") was located at Bautzen railway station towards the railway exit to Löbau/Görlitz and next to the industrial side of the old German Coach Works (Waggonbau Bautzen), today's Bombardier Transportation.

From the opening of the Görlitz–Dresden railway in 1846, it belonged to the Saxon-Silesian Railway Company, which was nationalized in 1851. In 1922, the Görlitz–Dresden railway was nationalized to the Reichsbahndirektion Dresden. Following the restructuring of the railways after the Second World War, Bautzen was incorporated into Reichsbahndirektion Cottbus.

During the Battle of Bautzen (1945) the station was set alight. After the war, the station building was rebuilt in a simplified form. The artist Alfred Herzog created eight sgraffiti in the station hall depicting LOWA wagon construction and traditional industries in Bautzen and the region.

In 1950 the sheds at both Bahnbetriebswerk Löbau and Bahnbetriebswerk Zittau still existed with trains leaving here hauled by locomotives of many different classes. These locomotives were similar to those during the Saxon state railway times.

Until 14 May 1988, working engines of Class 52 were still stabled here for scheduled services and for use as heating engines. Many of these engines are still used to this day.

In February 2014, the reception building was closed due to falling parts of the ceiling. An investor estimated the repairs at €5 million. Building worked lasted from 2017 to 2020, and the renovated reception building was opened on 24 January 2020.

Train services
The station is served by regional and local services operated by Trilex.

In 2006 the railway station was used by 2,500 passengers.

References

External links
 
 Deutsche Bahn website
 Ostdeutsche Eisenbahn website

Railway stations in Saxony
railway station
Buildings and structures in Bautzen (district)
Railway stations in Germany opened in 1846